Bsalim is a village in the Matn District in Mount Lebanon Governorate in Lebanon. The population is almost exclusively Christian. Bsalim's municipality also contains two small districts which are found around Bsalim, and they are Mezher and Majzoub. Bsalim is home to Greek Orthodox, Maronites, Catholics, Armenian Orthodox. In Bsalim are three churches: Saint Georges Cathedral-Greek Orthodox, Saint Mary's Church-Maronites and Christ the King Church. The cities around Bsalim are Antelias, Jal El Dib, Nabey, Roumieh, Kennebat Broumana and Bkennaya. The schools found in Bsalim are Athene de Beyrouth and Saint Georges-Bsalim.Some important sites people visit Bsalim for is Lebanese basketball since the home court of Hommentnen is located in Mezher.

During Operation Grapes of Wrath, 15 April 1996, the electrical transformer station in Bsalim was bombed by the Israeli Air Force and badly damaged. The day before a power station in Jamhour, 3 km east of Baabda had also been bombed. The air strikes left most of Beirut without electricity.

Notable people
 Diana Haddad (born 1976), Lebanese singer

External links
 Bsalim - Majzoub - Mezher, Localiban

References

Populated places in the Matn District
Christian communities in Lebanon